An Arab tribe in Lebanon.
Banu Al-Mashrouki is a branch of the Hamdan tribe in Lebanon.

In Lebanon
Banu Al-Mashrouki settled in Lebanon producing well known Maronite influential families such as the Awwad, Massa'ad, Al-Sema'ani mainly establishing Hasroun and Tanbourit 

Another branch of Bani Al-Mashrouki (Banu Al Harith) remained in Jabal Amil and were mainly Shia. A smaller group joined the Yemeni Druze and were eventually pushed by Kaysi Druze to Jabal Al Druze in Syria.

Mashrouki Maronite Patriarchs
Youssef al Sem'ani (1687-1768) 
Yaqoub Awwad (1705-1733) 
Sem'an Aawwad (1743-1756) 
Boulos Massead (1854-1890)
Youhanna El Hajj (1817-1898)

Notes

Tribes of Arabia
Lebanese noble families
Shia communities